Christina Ackermann (born 6 February 1990) is a retired German World Cup alpine ski racer. She specialised in slalom and competed in three Winter Olympics and four World Championships.

Born Christina Geiger in Oberstdorf, Bavaria, she made her World Cup debut in December 2008 and her first podium was a third place in slalom at Semmering in 2010. In her first Olympics in 2010, she was fourteenth in the slalom.

World Cup results

Season standings

Race podiums

 2 podiums – (1 SL 1 PS); 28 top tens

World Championship results

Olympic results

References

External links

 
 Christina Ackermann World Cup standings at the International Ski Federation
 
  
  
 
 
 

German female alpine skiers
1990 births
Living people
Alpine skiers at the 2010 Winter Olympics
Alpine skiers at the 2014 Winter Olympics
Alpine skiers at the 2018 Winter Olympics
Olympic alpine skiers of Germany
People from Oberstdorf
Sportspeople from Swabia (Bavaria)
21st-century German women